Pieter Anthonie Roelofsen (20 July 1908 – 26 December 1966) was a Dutch rower. He competed at the 1932 Summer Olympics in the coxless pairs, together with Godfried Roëll, and finished fourth, 0.2 seconds behind the third place. Roëll and Roelofsen won the European title in 1931.

References

1908 births
1966 deaths
Dutch male rowers
Olympic rowers of the Netherlands
Rowers at the 1932 Summer Olympics
Sportspeople from Bandung
European Rowing Championships medalists
20th-century Dutch people